Cetaceans are the animals commonly known as whales, dolphins, and porpoises. This list includes individuals from real life or fiction, where fictional individuals are indicated by their source. It is arranged roughly taxonomically.

Baleen whales

Rorquals 

 52-hertz whale (may be a blue whale hybrid)

Blue whales 

 KOBO

Fin whales

 Moby Joe, a fin whale who became trapped in Newfoundland, the subject of Farley Mowat's 1972 book A Whale for the Killing.

Humpback whales 

 Delta and Dawn
 George and Gracie from Star Trek IV: The Voyage Home
 Humphrey the Whale
 Migaloo
 The Montreal whale
 Mister Splashy Pants
 Tay Whale

Gray whales 

 Bonnet, Crossbeak, and Bone or Putu, Siku, and Kanik (in Inupiaq), or Fred, Wilma, and Bamm-Bamm in the book Big Miracle and film adaptation
 Klamath River Whales

Toothed whales

Beaked whales

Northern Bottlenose Whales 

 River Thames whale

Dolphins 

 Delphinus from Greek mythology
 Ivan and Bessie from the 1967 novel The Day of the Dolphin or Alpha and Beta in the 1973 film adaptation
 Slim and Delbert from the TV series Dolphin Cove
 Snorky from the Night of the Dolphin segment of The Simpsons 2000 episode "Treehouse of Horror XI"
 The dolphin from the fairy tale The Dolphin
 Zoom from the anime series Zoom the White Dolphin

Bottlenose dolphins 

 Akeakamai, featured in the novel Startide Rising
 Davina
 Ecco from the video game series Ecco the Dolphin
 Fungie
 Flipper from the 1963 film of the same name and later film and television series in the same franchise
 Hiapo
 Hope, featured in the film Dolphin Tale 2
 Mitzie, who portrayed Flipper
 Moko
 Opo
Peter, used in experiments in human-dolphin communication by John C. Lilly and Margaret Howe Lovatt
 Pinky
 Tião
 Winter, featured in the film Dolphin Tale

Orcas 

 Chimo
 Corky (II)
 Ethelbert
 Granny
 Hoi Wai, who portrayed Neptune in the film Moon Warriors
 Iceberg
 Jambu or Willzyx from the episode "Free Willzyx" of the TV series South Park
 Kalina
 Kanduke
 Kasatka
 Katina

 Keet
 Keto
 Keiko, who portrayed Willy in the film Free Willy
 Klee Wyck, the anthropomorphic mascot of the 1994 Commonwealth Games
 Kohana
 Kotar
 Lolita
 Luna
 Malia
 Moby Doll
 Morgan

 Namu, featured in the film Namu, the Killer Whale
 Neptune from the film Moon Warriors
 Ocean Sun (L25) 
 Old Thom
 Old Tom
 Port and Starboard
 Ramu III
 Samoa
 Scarlet

 Shamu
 Springer
 Tahlequah
 Takara
 The orca from the 1977 film Orca
 Tico from the anime series Tico of the Seven Seas
 Tilikum
 Ulises
 Unna
 Walter the Whale
 Wikie
 Willy from the film Free Willy and television adaptation

Risso's dolphins 

 Pelorus Jack
 Casper, an albino or leucistic Risso's dolphin inhabiting Monterey Bay, California.

Sperm whales 

 Little Irvy
 Moby Dick from the novel Moby-Dick
 Mocha Dick
 Monstro from Pinocchio
 Pearl Krabs from SpongeBob SquarePants
 Porphyrios (species uncertain)
 The sperm whale from the book The Hitchhiker's Guide to the Galaxy and later adaptations
 Timor Tom from Moby-Dick, chapter 45

Belugas 

 Baby Beluga from the music album of the same name
 Benny
 Hvaldimir
 Kayavak
 Moby Dick (Rhine)
 NOC

Legendary 
Because these individuals are legendary or mythic, their classification is unclear. As well, for some it is unclear whether they are even whales since whales were historically considered fish in Western culture.

 Cetus from Greek mythology
 Devil Whale from legends such as the First Voyage of Sinbad the Sailor
 Leviathan from Abrahamic mythology
 Makara from Hindu mythology (possibly a South Asian river dolphin)
 Rongomai from Māori mythology
 Tannin from Canaanite, Phoenician, and Hebrew mythology
 The whale who saved Kahutia-te-rangi in Māori mythology (usually considered to be a humpback whale -  - a name Kahutia-te-rangi would adopt himself)
 The whale from the Book of Jonah

See also

 
 Killer whales in popular culture
 List of captive killer whales
 List of cetaceans
 Military marine mammal

References

cetaceans
Individual cetaceans
Cetacean-related lists